The Basava Express is an Express train belonging to South Western Railway zone that runs between  and  in India. It is currently being operated with 17307/17308 train numbers on a daily basis.

Service

The 17307/Basava Express has an average speed of 44 km/h and covers 1007 km in 22h 40m. The 17308/Basava Express has an average speed of 43 km/hr and covers 1007 km in 23h 40m.

Schedule

Route and halts 

The important halts of the train are:

Coach composition

The train has standard ICF rakes with a max speed of 110 km/h. The train consists of 17 coaches:

 1 AC II Tier
 1 AC III Tier
 7 Sleeper coaches
 5 General Unreserved
 2 Seating cum Luggage Rake

Traction

Both trains are hauled by a Vijayawada or Arakkonam-based WAP-4 electric locomotive from Mysore to Bangalore and a Hubli Loco Shed-based WDP-4D diesel locomotive from Bangalore to Bagalkot and vice versa

Rake sharing 

The train shares its rake with 17301/17302 Mysore–Dharwad Express.

Direction reversal

The train reverses its direction 1 times:

See also 

 Mysore Junction railway station
 Bagalkot railway station
 Mysore–Dharwad Express

Notes

References

External links 

 17307/Basava Express India Rail Info
 17308/Basava Express India Rail Info

Transport in Mysore
Named passenger trains of India
Rail transport in Karnataka
Rail transport in Andhra Pradesh
Rail transport in Maharashtra
Railway services introduced in 2002
Express trains in India